Rodney Simon Berman OBE is a Liberal Democrat politician, currently a councillor for the Penylan ward of Cardiff. He was formerly a councillor for Plasnewydd ward, and was also leader of Cardiff Council between 2004 and 2012.

Early life
Born and raised in Glasgow, Berman studied at the University of Glasgow where he helped run Glasgow University Liberal Democrats, before moving to Wales to study towards a PhD.

Career
Berman stood for election to Parliament as Welsh Liberal Democrat candidate for Rhondda and Cardiff South and Penarth in 1997 and 2001, respectively, coming third on each occasion. His agent for the Rhondda seat was Professor Russell Deacon. Berman was the last Liberal Democrat to secure their electoral deposit there until the general election of 2010.

In 2006, Berman was the first winner of the Local Politician of the Year award.

The local elections of 2008 saw the Liberal Democrats under Berman's leadership increase their representation, winning new seats in the east (Trowbridge), west (Llandaff) and south of the city (Butetown). Under Berman's leadership, the Liberal Democrats gained and then lost their largest representation in Cardiff for over a century.

In the 2012 council elections, the Liberal Democrats lost control of Cardiff Council to Welsh Labour, and Berman also lost his seat after two recounts.

Berman was appointed Officer of the Order of the British Empire (OBE) in the 2013 New Year Honours for services to local government and the community in Cardiff.

He returned as a councillor in May 2017 for the Penylan Ward.

At the 2021 Senedd election, he was the Lib Dem candidate for Cardiff Central, coming second to Jenny Rathbone. He also stood on the list vote for the South Wales Central region.

Personal life
In August 2006, Berman entered into a Civil Partnership with his partner, former ITV News journalist Nick Speed.

References 
 Balsom, Denis. The Wales Yearbook 2007. Francis Balsom Associates Limited. 2006

External links 

 "It's just not cricket" - The Western Mail
 "‘Cardiff residents should get to vote for a mayor’" - Wales Online
 "Directly-elected mayor would have too much power, says Rodney Berman" - Wales Online
 "Cardiff council hits back at rubbish collection complaints" - Wales Online
 "Concern over city school shake-up" - BBC News
 "Cardiff 'behind' in culture city race" - BBC News
 "Council to reveal school closures" - BBC News

1969 births
Living people
Alumni of the University of Glasgow
Councillors in Cardiff
Gay politicians
Liberal Democrats (UK) councillors
Liberal Democrats (UK) parliamentary candidates
Officers of the Order of the British Empire
Scottish LGBT politicians
Politicians from Glasgow
Welsh LGBT politicians
Leaders of local authorities of Wales